Gerard Weber (born 22 August 1941) is a Dutch former footballer who played as a left winger.

Career
Born in 's-Hertogenbosch, Weber started playing soccer at BVV Den Bosch, with whom he later made his debut in paid football in the Eerste Divisie. Initially, Weber played on in professional leagues on amateur contracts because of his day job as a salesperson. As a result, Joseph Gruber could select him for the Dutch amateur football team. He also played for the Dutch military football team. Joseph Gruber brought Weber in 1961 to VV DOS, where Weber turned full-professional and played in the Eredivisie. With DOS he played in the 1962–63 and 1963–64 Inter-Cities Fairs Cup.

After three seasons at DOS and one more year at BVV, Weber signed with NEC Nijmegen. In January 1969 he joined PSV Eindhoven and a year later EVV Eindhoven, where he ended his career. With PSV he participated in the 1969–70 edition of the UEFA Cup Winners' Cup.

Personal life
Gerard's brothers, Harrie and Sjef, also played for BVV.

Career statistics

References 

Living people
1941 births
Sportspeople from 's-Hertogenbosch
Dutch footballers
Footballers from North Brabant
Association football wingers
FC Den Bosch players
VV DOS players
NEC Nijmegen players
PSV Eindhoven players
FC Eindhoven players